The Cerro Castillo Formation is a Jurassic geologic formation in Argentina. Dinosaur remains diagnostic to the genus level are among the fossils that have been recovered from the formation.

Paleofauna 
 Megalosaurus chubutensis - "Tooth." (nomen dubium)
 M. inexpectatus - "Tooth." - (tetan indet)

See also 

 List of dinosaur-bearing rock formations
 List of stratigraphic units with few dinosaur genera

References

Bibliography 
 Weishampel, David B.; Dodson, Peter; and Osmólska, Halszka (eds.): The Dinosauria, 2nd, Berkeley: University of California Press. 861 pp. 

Geologic formations of Argentina
Jurassic Argentina
Fossiliferous stratigraphic units of South America
Paleontology in Argentina